Lý Tự Trọng (20 October 1914 in Thailand – 21 November 1931 in Saigon; born Lê Hữu Trọng) was a Vietnamese revolutionary, executed by the French when he was only 17 years old. He is considered to be a revolutionary martyr. In 2010, his remains were identified in District 10, Ho Chi Minh City, and he was reburied in his parents' home town, the Việt Xuyên commune in the district of Thạch Hà.

On February 9, 1931, during a rally in Le Grand Park in Saigon, celebrating the anniversary of the Yen Bai uprising, Trong used a firearm to shoot at anti-Communist French secret police. He did that to protect Phan Bội Châu, who was speaking at the rally. There was a fear Phan Boi would be assassinated, due to the inflammatory and Marxist-oriented content of his speech. He fled south as a fugitive. He was brought back to Saigon, hastily tried by French officials, sentenced to death on November 20, 1931, and executed the next day, aged 17. The cruel punishment suffered by Trong sparked strong feelings of anger amongst Communists all over Vietnam toward the French leadership. Trong was viewed as a martyr and his fate was seen as symbolic of French brutality.

Ly Tu Trong Street in Saigon is named after him, replacing the street's original name, "Duong Gia Long", given by the previous South Vietnamese government, commemorating the 18th century Vietnamese emperor who quashed the Tay Son rebels, unified and modernized Vietnam, and weakened French influence in the country. The street includes the former US AID building, famous as the location of the helicopter evacuation U.S government employees during the Fall of Saigon in 1975.

References

Vietnamese nationalists
Vietnamese revolutionaries
1914 births
1931 deaths
20th-century executions of Vietnamese people
People executed by the French Third Republic
20th-century executions by France
Executed revolutionaries